The 1954 Cork Senior Hurling Championship was the 66th staging of the Cork Senior Hurling Championship since its establishment by the Cork County Board in 1887. The draw for the opening round of the championship took place at the Cork Convention on 24 January 1954. The championship began on 28 March 1954 and ended on 26 September 1954.

Glen Rovers entered the championship as the defending champions.

On 26 September 1954, Glen Rovers won the championship following a 3-7 to 3-2 defeat of Blackrock in the final. This was their 15th championship title overall and their second title in succession.

Team changes

To Championship

Promoted from the Cork Intermediate Hurling Championship
 Newtownshandrum

Results

First round

Second round

Quarter-finals

Semi-finals

Final

References

Cork Senior Hurling Championship
Cork Senior Hurling Championship